I, Q is a series of young adult fiction mystery books. The first three are  written by Roland Smith and the rest are co-written by Smith and Michael P. Spradlin.  They concern a thirteen-year-old boy named "Quest" – whose nickname is "Q" – and whose parents are well-known rock musicians.  He and his stepsister Angela get involved with the U.S. Secret Service and the Israeli Mossad and are protected by Tyrone Boone and his group SOS (Some Old Spooks).

Books

References

Book series introduced in 2008
American children's novels
Series of children's books
Children's mystery novels